The 2017 World Table Tennis Championships mixed doubles was the 54th edition of the mixed doubles championship.  

Xu Xin and Yang Ha-eun were the defending champions but Xu did not compete this year.

Maharu Yoshimura and Kasumi Ishikawa won the title after defeating Chen Chien-an and Cheng I-ching 8–11, 8–11, 11–8, 10–12, 11–4, 11–9, 11–5.

Seeds
Matches were best of 5 games in qualification and best of 7 games in the 64-player sized main draw.

  Lee Sang-su /  Yang Ha-eun (quarterfinals)
  Wong Chun Ting /  Doo Hoi Kem (semifinals)
  Mattias Karlsson /  Matilda Ekholm (quarterfinals)
  Ho Kwan Kit/  Lee Ho Ching (second round)
  Chen Chien-an /  Cheng I-ching (final)
  Maharu Yoshimura /  Kasumi Ishikawa (champions)
  Fang Bo /  Petrissa Solja (semifinals)
  Jakub Dyjas /  Katarzyna Grzybowska (first round)
  Steffen Mengel /  Kristin Silbereisen (third round)
  Vítor Ishiy/  Caroline Kumahara (second round)
  Chuang Chih-yuan /  Chen Szu-yu (third round)
  Omar Assar /  Dina Meshref (third round)
  Jonathan Groth /  Feng Yalan (third round)
  Jang Woo-jin /  Lee Zi-on (third round)
  Gaston Alto/  Ana Codina (second round)
  Grigory Vlasov /  Yana Noskova (third round)
  Pang Xue Jie/  Yu Mengyu (second round)
  Tomáš Konečný/  Hana Matelová (second round)
  Segun Toriola /  Olufunke Oshonaike (first round)
  Ovidiu Ionescu/  Bernadette Szőcs (second round)
  Pak Sin-hyok /  Ri Hyon-sim (third round)
  Krisztián Nagy /  Szandra Pergel (third round)
  Mohamed El-Beiali /  Yousra Abdel Razek (first round)
  Brian Afanador /  Adriana Díaz (first round)
  Sathiyan Gnanasekaran/  Manika Batra (second round)
  Benedikt Duda /  Sabine Winter (first round)
  Nándor Ecseki/  Dóra Madarász (second round)
  Daniel González /  Melanie Díaz (first round)
  Aleksandar Karakašević /  Rūta Paškauskienė (first round)
  Eric Jouti /  Lin Gui (first round)
  Padasak Tanviriyavechakul/  Suthasini Sawettabut (second round)
  Eric Glod /  Sarah De Nutte (first round)

Draw

Finals

Top half

Section 1

Section 2

Bottom half

Section 3

Section 4

References

External links
Main draw

Mixed Doubles